Hylephila ancora, commonly known as the Ancora skipper, is a species of butterfly in the family Hesperiidae. It was first described by Carl Plötz in 1883. It is found in Bolivia, Uruguay and Argentina.

References

Butterflies described in 1883
Hesperiini
Hesperiidae of South America